Dysmicoccus is a genus of scales and mealybugs in the family Pseudococcidae. There are at least 110 described species in Dysmicoccus.

See also
 List of Dysmicoccus species

References

Further reading

 
 
 
 

Sternorrhyncha genera
Pseudococcidae